Sayyid Muhammad Qanauji was a Sufi scholar who was chaplain to the Mughal emperor Shah Jahan (1592–1666) and teacher of his son, the emperor Aurangzeb (1618–1707).

Life

Mir Sayyid Muhammad Qanauji was the chaplain of the Mughal emperor Shah Jahan (1592–1666).
Sayyid Qanquji and Sayyid Fazil attended Shah Jahan during the last seven years of his life, when Shah Jahan was imprisoned in the fort at Akbarabad.
Sayyid and the emperor's eldest daughter Jahanara were present with Shah Jahan during his last days, providing spiritual comfort and nursing.
When the emperor knew he was dying, he praised Sayyid for his faithful service and asked if there was any way he could reward him.
Sayyid asked him to forgive his son Aurangzeb (1618–1707), and the emperor reluctantly agreed.
After Shah Jahan's death Sayyid Muhammad helped prepare the body for burial, which was done with little ceremony since Aurangzeb had not ordered a state funeral.

Sayyid Qannauji taught Aurangzeb, and a letter written for him in Arabic by Aurangzeb has survived.
Even after Aurangzeb ascended the throne, he would meet with Sayyid three times a week.
Sayyid was a disciple of Muhibullah Allahabadi.
It is said that Aurangzeb summoned Sayyid and asked him to explain how some of Muhibbullah's statements could be reconciled with Sharia, or he would burn Muhibullah's writings. Sayyid replied that he could only explain Muhibullah's words when he reached a similar spiritual status, which was far above his present condition. He also said that the emperor had enough fire in his kitchen and did not have to use a poor man's fire.

Sayyid Qannauji is said to have collaborated with another of Aurangzeb's tutors, Mulla Abu'l Wa-iz, in compiling the Fatawa-e-Alamgiri, a manual of Islamic jurisprudence the emperor commissioned in the late 1660s.
Sayyid was deputy to Qazi Abdul Wahhab in marrying Aurangzeb 's son Prince Azam on 21 December 1668.
He was a witness to the marriage of Prince Muhammad Sultan on 16 December 1672.
Aurangzib appointed Sayyid Sharif Khan, son of Sayyid Qannauji, the Karori-i ganj (censor) of the imperial camp and collector of jizya for the four provinces of the Deccan.
Sharif Khan replaced Qazi Muhammad Husain, who had died.

References

Sources

Indian Sufi religious leaders
17th-century Indian people
Mughal Empire people